Isthmohyla is a genus of frogs in the family Hylidae. This genus was erected in 2005 following a major revision of the Hylidae. The 15 species in this genus were previously placed in the genus Hyla. They are endemic to Central America in Honduras, Costa Rica, and Panama.

Species
This genus has 14 recognized species:

References

 
Hylinae
Amphibian genera
Amphibians of Central America
Taxa named by Jonathan A. Campbell
Taxa named by Darrel Frost